Tychowo is a town in Białogard County, north-west Poland.

Tychowo may also refer to the following villages:
Tychowo, Sławno County
Tychowo, Stargard County